Parti Socialiste (Socialist Party) may refer to:

 Parti Socialiste (Belgium)
 Parti Socialiste (France)
 Parti Socialiste (Mauritius) (PS), see List of political parties in Mauritius
 Parti Socialiste Mauricien (PSM), see List of political parties in Mauritius
 Parti Socialiste du Sénégal, Senegal
 Parti Socialiste Suisse, Switzerland
 Partie Socialiste (Tunisia)

See also 
 Socialist Party (disambiguation)